Raza Island is an island in British Columbia, Canada. It is part of the Rendezvous Islands in Calm Channel, which in turn are part of the Discovery Islands between Vancouver Island and the mainland, between the Strait of Georgia and Johnstone Strait.

Raza Island is located within Electoral Area C of the Strathcona Regional District.

References

Islands of the Discovery Islands
South Coast of British Columbia